Pehchaan or Pehchan may refer to:
 Pehchan (1946 film), a Hindi language film
 Pehchan (1970 film), a Hindi language film starring Manoj Kumar, Babita, and Balraj Sahni
 Pehchan (1975 film), a Pakistani action-drama film
 Pehchaan (1993 film), a Hindi language film
 Pehchaan (2009 TV series), a 2009 Hindi drama series on the Indian national channel, DD National
 Pehchaan 3D, a 2013 Punjabi film
 Pehchaan: The Face of Truth, a 2005 Bollywood movie starring Vinod Khanna, Rati Agnihotri, & Raveena Tandon
 Pehchaan (2014 TV series), a 2014 Pakistani drama television series aired on A-Plus Entertainment
 Pehchaan (2006 TV series), a 2006 Pakistani drama serial aired on Hum TV, directed by Mehreen Jabbar